The Sony Vaio 800 series was a range of Vaio laptops launched in 1998. It was produced until early 1999.

Technical specifications
The lineup featured a 13.3" 1024x768 LCD screen that fit into the same weight and thickness as the company's 700 series, which had a smaller 12.1" screen (2.4 kg without optical drive or floppy drive, 2.7 kg with optical drive). Like the 700 series, the 800 series featured removable 3.5" floppy disk and CD-ROM drive and optional docking station. The internal modem was a 56 kbit device.

The launch model, the PCG-808, was equipped with a Mobile Pentium II 266 MHz CPU, a 4 GB hard drive, 64 MB of RAM and was priced at $3699. A lower-end 803 model, with a 233 MHz Pentium II, was also sold in Japan. The GPU for all models was the NeoMagic MagicMedia 256 AV with 2.5 MB of RAM.

Models

References

External links 
 VAIO – PCG-808, 803, 737/A4G, 733A. Sony Official Website. Retrieved April 2, 2011. 
 Sony VAIO PCG-818 Pentium II 300 Notebook. AnandTech. January 19, 1999. Retrieved April 2, 2011.

800